Events in the year 2005 in Norway.

Incumbents
 Monarch: Harald V
 Regent: Haakon from 29 March to 7 June 2005 (during the King's recovering from heart surgery)
 President of the Storting: 
 Prime Minister: Kjell Magne Bondevik (Christian Democratic Party) to 17 October, then Jens Stoltenberg (Labour Party)

Events

January

 1 January
 New Year's celebrations all over Norway fall silent for two minutes as mark of respect for Scandinavian memorial service for those affected by the 2004 Indian Ocean tsunami.
 The University of Stavanger is established.

February

March

 11 March – Ole Christian Kvarme is appointed bishop of Oslo.

April

May

June
 8 June – At least 10 people are feared dead after an outbreak of Legionnaires' disease. The source is localized to a Borregaard treatment plant in Sarpsborg.
 13 June – The new Svinesund Bridge is opened. The old Svinesund Bridge still stands 1 kilometre to the east.

July
 14 July – The Nærøyfjord, the Geiranger Fjord and the Struve Geodetic Arc are designated by UNESCO as World Heritage Sites.

August

September
 12 September – The 2005 Parliamentary election takes place. The election was won by the opposition centre-left Red-Green Coalition, which took 87 seats.
 19 September – The trial of the accused in the NOKAS robbery starts in Stavanger.

October

 17 October – Norwegian Prime Minister Jens Stoltenberg's Second Cabinet was appointed after the 2005 Parliamentary elections and Bondevik's step down.

November

December

Popular culture

Sports

Music 

 Norway in the Eurovision Song Contest 2005
 Rock band Accidents Never Happen forms

Film

Literature

Television

Anniversaries
 7 June – Centennial of the dissolution of the union between Norway and Sweden.

Notable births
 8 April – Leah Isadora Behn, the second daughter of Princess Märtha Louise of Norway and husband Ari Behn
 3 December – Prince Sverre Magnus of Norway, the second child of Haakon, Crown Prince of Norway and his wife Mette-Marit, Crown Princess of Norway

Notable deaths
6 January – Nora Strømstad, alpine skier (born 1909)
13 January – Karstein Seland, politician (born 1912)
20 January – Per Borten, Prime Minister (born 1913)

2 February – Anders Hveem, bobsledder (born 1924)
2 February – Svein Kvia, footballer (born 1947)
20 February – Johan Østby, politician (born 1924)

12 March – Johan Skipnes, politician (born 1909)
17 March – Sverre Holm, actor (born 1931)

8 April – Jeremi Wasiutyński, Polish-Norwegian astrophysician, philosopher and depth-psychologist (born 1907)

31 May – Ole J. Malm, physician (born 1910).

2 June – Gunder Gundersen, Nordic combined skier and sports official (born 1930)

7 July – Gunnar Fredrik Hellesen, politician and Minister (born 1913)
20 July – Finn Gustavsen, politician (born 1926)

21 August – Liv Aasen, politician (born 1928)

24 September – Arna Vågen, missionary and politician (born 1905)

8 October – Erik Grønseth, social scientist and sociologist (born 1925)
18 October – Sverre Mitsem, judge (born 1944)
29 October – Elsa Skjerven, politician and Minister (born 1919)

1 November – Carl Mortensen, sailor and Olympic silver medallist (born 1919)
23 November – Ingvil Aarbakke, artist (born 1970)

1 December – Roar Petersen, novelist (born 1934).
3 December – Kåre Kristiansen, politician (born 1920)
17 December – Sverre Stenersen, Nordic combined skier, Olympic gold medallist and World Champion (born 1926)

24 December – Georg Johannesen, author and professor of rhetoric (born 1931)
29 December – Gerda Boyesen, founder of Biodynamic Psychology (born 1922)

Full date missing
Jens-Halvard Bratz, businessman, politician and Minister (born 1920)
Eivind Erichsen, economist and civil servant (born 1917)
Reidar Grønhaug, social anthropologist (born 1938)
Geir Grung, diplomat (born 1938)
Ivar Johansen, journalist and editor (born 1923)
Ola H. Metliaas, civil servant and politician (born 1943)
Ove Skaug, engineer and civil servant (born 1912)

See also

References

External links

 
Norway